Jarl Inge Melberg (born 22 February 1970) is a retired freestyle Norwegian swimmer. He was born in Sarpsborg. He competed at the 1992 Summer Olympics in Barcelona but did not medal. He won a total of 42 gold medals at the Norwegian championships.

References

External links

1970 births
Living people
People from Sarpsborg
Norwegian male freestyle swimmers
Olympic swimmers of Norway
Swimmers at the 1992 Summer Olympics
Sportspeople from Viken (county)
20th-century Norwegian people